Compton Vyfhuis (30 May 1932 – 23 January 2009) was a West Indian cricket umpire. He stood in six Test matches between 1974 and 1978 and two ODI games between 1977 and 1981.

See also
 List of Test cricket umpires
 List of One Day International cricket umpires

References

1932 births
2009 deaths
Sportspeople from Georgetown, Guyana
West Indian Test cricket umpires
West Indian One Day International cricket umpires